Lake Sacajawea is a lake formed by the Ice Harbor Dam on the Snake River. It stretches from there upstream to the Lower Monumental Dam. It is named for Sacajawea, a Shoshone woman who accompanied Meriwether Lewis and William Clark during their exploration of the American West.

Bodies of water of Franklin County, Washington
Sacajawea
Bodies of water of Walla Walla County, Washington
Protected areas of Franklin County, Washington
Protected areas of Walla Walla County, Washington